Government General Degree College at Keshiary, also commonly known as Keshiary Government College, was established in 2015. This government degree college is located in Paschim Medinipur district, around 26 km away from Kharagpur. It offers undergraduate courses in arts and science. It is affiliated to Vidyasagar University. 

Honours courses which are being offered in the academic year 2018-2019 (CBCS): Zoology, Botany, Anthropology, Santali, Bengali, English, Political Science and History. Besides, general courses are also offered in the arts subjects (CBCS).

Departments

Arts

Bengali
English
History
Political Science
Santali

Science
Anthropology
Botany
Zoology
Chemistry

See also

References

External links

Vidyasagar University
University Grants Commission
National Assessment and Accreditation Council

Universities and colleges in Paschim Medinipur district
Colleges affiliated to Vidyasagar University
Educational institutions established in 2015
2015 establishments in West Bengal